Flax biaki is a moth of the family Erebidae first described by Michael Fibiger in 2011. It is found in Indonesia (it was described from Biak Island, Western New Guinea).

The wingspan is about 9 mm. The forewings (including fringes) are beige brown, although there are brown areas on the subterminal and terminal areas. The base of the costa is dark brown. There is a dark brown quadrangular patch in the upper medial area, with a black dot in the inner lower area. The crosslines are mostly indistinct. The subterminal line is brown and the terminal line is indicated by dark-brown interveinal dots. The hindwings are light grey. The underside of the forewings is unicolorous brown and the underside of the hindwings is grey with a discal spot.

References

Micronoctuini
Moths described in 2011
Taxa named by Michael Fibiger